Luca Dotto (born 18 April 1990) is an Italian swimmer. He holds the Italian record in the 100 m freestyle with a time of 47.96 and was the first Italian to break 48 seconds. He also won the silver medal in the 50 m freestyle at the 2011 World Aquatics Championships in Shanghai.

Dotto is an athlete of the Centro Sportivo Carabinieri.

Biography
He competed at the 2012 and 2016 Summer Olympics, competing in the 50 m and 100 m freestyle, and as part of the Italian men's 4 x 100 m freestyle and 4 x 100 m medley on both occasions.

See also
 Italian swimmers multiple medalists at the international competitions

References

External links

1990 births
Living people
Italian male freestyle swimmers
Olympic swimmers of Italy
Swimmers at the 2012 Summer Olympics
Swimmers at the 2016 Summer Olympics
People from Camposampiero
World Aquatics Championships medalists in swimming
European Aquatics Championships medalists in swimming
Medalists at the FINA World Swimming Championships (25 m)
Mediterranean Games gold medalists for Italy
Mediterranean Games silver medalists for Italy
Mediterranean Games bronze medalists for Italy
Swimmers at the 2013 Mediterranean Games
European Championships (multi-sport event) silver medalists
Mediterranean Games medalists in swimming
Swimmers of Centro Sportivo Carabinieri
Swimmers at the 2018 Mediterranean Games
Sportspeople from the Province of Padua
21st-century Italian people